GURPS Callahan's Crosstime Saloon is a sourcebook for GURPS. It is a part of the extensive GURPS "generic" roleplaying system.

Contents
This is a sourcebook for an alternate world-themed role-playing game based in a fictional bar/space nexus that was created by Spider Robinson in his novel Callahan's Crosstime Saloon.

Publication history
GURPS Callahan's Crosstime Saloon was designed by Chris W. McCubbin, and edited by Jeff Koke and Steve Jackson, and published by Steve Jackson Games as a 128-page softcover book. The book features additional material by Spider Robinson, Steve Jackson, and Christian Wagner, and illustrations by Donna Barr, Guy Burcham, Dan Frazier, and Rick Harris with a cover by James Warhola. The GURPS source book was published in 1992.

Reception
Rick Swan reviewed GURPS Callahan's Crosstime Saloon for Dragon magazine #190 (February 1993). According to Swan, Callahan's Crosstime Saloon "works best as a framing device or an interlude in a conventional fantasy or science-fiction campaign, providing the players can tolerate a little whimsy. There are a fair number of new rules, among them guidelines for psi-blocking powers and intoxication effects, but not enough to discourage determined referees from adapting the book to a different game system."

References

Callahan's Crosstime Saloon
Role-playing game supplements introduced in 1992